Gia Woods (born May 22, 1996) is a Los Angeles-based pop musician.

Early life 
Woods grew up in a traditional Persian household in Los Angeles. Her father owned a popular Persian restaurant, and her mother was a stay-at-home mom who also handled the business side of the restaurant. Woods became interested in music in part because she "was pretty shy and didn’t have a lot of people to open up to." Her older sister encouraged her to join choir in high school, which led to her pursuit of music as a career.

Career
Woods was scouted by her first manager in her senior year of high school from a choir performance. As a result, she pursued music full time immediately after graduating, rather than going into dentistry as she had planned.

Woods debuted in 2015 with the song "Only A Girl," which describes her first same-sex relationship. Woods came out as a lesbian to her family through the song. The accompanying music video has over 10 million hits on YouTube.

Woods released her debut EP Cut Season on October 9, 2020. The EP was influenced by the lack of support Woods received from friends after her experience leaving a four-year relationship and her father's passing.

In 2021, Woods released the first part of her two-volume EP, Heartbreak County, which reflects on life in Los Angeles. She announced the second part with the release of its lead single, "Hello", in May 2022. The full EP was released in October 2022; while the first part covers more of the surface-level glamor of Los Angeles life, the second part explores its "deeper, more raw side." Woods described the writing process for Heartbreak County as a form of escapism following a breakup. The breakup, in which her ex-girlfriend left her to date Woods's other ex-girlfriend, was the subject of the final song from the EP.

Involvement in the LGBT Community

Woods has performed at several LGBT events, such as Nashville's OutLoud Music Festival in 2019, North Jersey Pride Festival in 2019, the Thrive with Pride concert in 2021, and Jersey Pride in 2022. She has also been featured in Calvin Klein's LGBTQ Pride campaign, and has been a Savage X Fenty ambassador.

Influences
Woods is inspired by Radiohead, Green Day and Madonna.

Discography

Extended plays

Singles

References 

1996 births
21st-century American women singers
American women pop singers
American women singer-songwriters
American people of Iranian descent
American lesbian musicians
American LGBT singers
Living people
Musicians from Los Angeles
21st-century American singers
20th-century American LGBT people
21st-century American LGBT people
Singer-songwriters from California